The Norwood state by-election, 1979 was a by-election held on 10 March 1979 for the South Australian House of Assembly seat of Norwood. This was triggered by the resignation of Premier and Labor MHA Don Dunstan. Created and first contested at the 1938 state election, the seat had been held by Dunstan since the 1953 state election.

Results
Labor retained the seat on a considerably reduced majority.

See also
List of South Australian state by-elections

References

South Australian state by-elections
1979 elections in Australia
1970s in South Australia
March 1979 events in Australia